Simone Caruso (born 9 September 1994) is an Italian footballer who plays as a winger for Eccellenza club Sporting Pedara.

Club career 

Caruso is a youth exponent from Catania. He made his Serie A debut on 27 April 2014 in a 4-0 away defeat against Verona.

In the summer 2019, Caruso joined Eccellenza club Sporting Pedara.

References

Italian footballers
1994 births
Living people
Serie A players
Serie C players
Serie D players
Catania S.S.D. players
A.S. Martina Franca 1947 players
U.S.D. Atletico Catania players
A.S.D. Paternò 1908 players
Association football wingers
U.S. Castrovillari Calcio players